The Abbotsford was a scooter-like lightweight bike with a 1.5 bhp overhead valve engine. Production was limited.

See also
Abbotsford motorcycles

References

External links
 Line drawing

Motorcycle manufacturers of the United Kingdom
Motorcycles introduced in the 1910s